Yury Konstantinovich Zaitsev (17 January 1951 – 30 September 2022) was a Soviet weightlifter and Olympic champion who competed for Soviet Union. He won a gold medal at the 1976 Summer Olympics in Montreal.

References

1951 births
2022 deaths
Russian male weightlifters
Soviet male weightlifters
Olympic weightlifters of the Soviet Union
Weightlifters at the 1976 Summer Olympics
Olympic gold medalists for the Soviet Union
Olympic medalists in weightlifting
European champions in weightlifting
Medalists at the 1976 Summer Olympics
Honoured Masters of Sport of the USSR
World Weightlifting Championships medalists
Sportspeople from Sakhalin Oblast